The 1972 Chicago Cubs season was the 101st season of the Chicago Cubs franchise, the 97th in the National League and the 57th at Wrigley Field. The Cubs finished second in the National League East with a record of 85–70.

Offseason 
 November 29, 1971: Ken Holtzman was traded by the Cubs to the Oakland Athletics for Rick Monday.
 December 1, 1971: Ernie Banks was released by the Cubs.
 January 20, 1972: Johnny Callison was traded by the Cubs to the New York Yankees for a player to be named later. The Yankees completed the deal by sending Jack Aker to the Cubs on May 17.
 February 14, 1972: Julio González was signed as an amateur free agent by the Cubs.

Regular season

Season standings

Record vs. opponents

Notable transactions 
 August 18, 1972: Tommy Davis was traded by the Cubs to the Baltimore Orioles for Elrod Hendricks.

Draft picks 
 June 6, 1972: 1972 Major League Baseball draft
Buddy Schultz was drafted by the Cubs in the 6th round.
Ray Burris was drafted by the Cubs in the 17th round. Player signed June 11, 1972.

Roster

Player stats

Batting

Starters by position 
Note: Pos = Position; G = Games played; AB = At bats; H = Hits; Avg. = Batting average; HR = Home runs; RBI = Runs batted in

Other batters 
Note: G = Games played; AB = At bats; H = Hits; Avg. = Batting average; HR = Home runs; RBI = Runs batted in

Pitching

Starting pitchers 
Note: G = Games pitched; IP = Innings pitched; W = Wins; L = Losses; ERA = Earned run average; SO = Strikeouts

Other pitchers 
Note: G = Games pitched; IP = Innings pitched; W = Wins; L = Losses; ERA = Earned run average; SO = Strikeouts

Relief pitchers 
Note: G = Games pitched; W = Wins; L = Losses; SV = Saves; ERA = Earned run average; SO = Strikeouts

Farm system 

LEAGUE CHAMPIONS: GCL Cubs

Notes

References 

1972 Chicago Cubs season at Baseball Reference

Chicago Cubs seasons
Chicago Cubs season
Chicago Cubs